Leonard James Matuszek (born September 27, 1954), is an American former professional baseball first baseman and outfielder, who played in Major League Baseball (MLB) for the Philadelphia Phillies, Toronto Blue Jays, and Los Angeles Dodgers from  to . He batted left-handed and threw right-handed. Matuszek is an alumnus of the University of Toledo, where he played both varsity baseball and basketball, for all four of his college years. He was inducted into the Varsity “T” Athletic Hall-Of-Fame, in 1986.

Career
Matuszek attended Moeller High School in Cincinnati and led his Crusader baseball team to the Ohio State Championship, in 1972. It was Moeller’s first State Title (in any team sport) in school history. He also led the Greater Cincinnati League (GCL) in scoring during his senior year in basketball, averaging 18.4 points per game (ppg).
For his efforts, Matuszek was inducted into Moeller’s first Athletic Hall-Of-Fame class, in 1982.

Matuszek was drafted by the Philadelphia Phillies in the 5th round (113th pick overall) of the 1976 Major League Baseball Draft. For his Phillies debut, on September 3, 1981, he hit a pinch-hit double in his first MLB at-bat, off of Bruce Berenyi of the Cincinnati Reds. Matuszek appeared in his final big league game on April 30, 1987, at Pittsburgh’s Three Rivers Stadium as his visiting Dodgers team lost to the Pirates, 5-4.

Matuszek is known for taking over the role as starting first baseman for the Philadelphia Phillies after they released Pete Rose following the  season. In , Matuszek’s first and only season as the Phillies’ starting first sacker, his stat line included a .248 batting average, with 12 home runs, and 43 runs batted in (RBI). That season, he was the top pinch-hitter in the National League (NL); coming off the bench, Matuszek compiled an impressive .400 batting average, with 3 homers, and 10 RBI.

References

External links

Len Matuszek at SABR (Baseball BioProject)
Len Matuszek at Baseball Almanac
Len Matuszek at Baseball Gauge
Len Matuszek at Baseball Library

1954 births
Living people
American expatriate baseball players in Canada
Baseball players from Cincinnati
Los Angeles Dodgers players
Major League Baseball first basemen
Major League Baseball left fielders
Major League Baseball right fielders
Major League Baseball third basemen
Oklahoma City 89ers players
Peninsula Pilots players
Philadelphia Phillies players
Portland Beavers players
Reading Phillies players
Sportspeople from Toledo, Ohio
Toledo Rockets baseball players
Toledo Rockets men's basketball players
Toronto Blue Jays players